Vardavard-e Olya (also Romanized as Vardāvard-e ‘Olyā; also known as Var Dāvad-e ‘Olyā and Vardāvūd-e Bālā) is a village in Khorram Rud Rural District, in the Central District of Tuyserkan County, Hamadan Province, Iran. At the 2006 census, its population was 1,558, in 371 families.

References 

Populated places in Tuyserkan County